Alfred Samuel Shawyer (1907–1971) was an English boxer who competed for England.

Boxing career
Shawyer won a gold medal in the middleweight division at the 1934 British Empire Games in London.

Shawyer won the 1933 Amateur Boxing Association British middleweight title, when boxing out of the Old Goldsmiths ABC. He later defeated Johnny Williams of Brooklyn in the New York Golden Gloves tournament during 1935. On 8 December 1935, in the Oslo Colosseum, he fought Henry Tiller in England's first match against Norway.

Personal life
He was a fireman by trade and lived at 81 Edward Street, Deptford in 1935.

References

1907 births
1971 deaths
English male boxers
Commonwealth Games gold medallists for England
Commonwealth Games medallists in boxing
Boxers at the 1934 British Empire Games
Middleweight boxers
Medallists at the 1934 British Empire Games